) was the winning song of the Eurovision Song Contest 1963, which took place on 23 March in London. It was performed in Danish by husband and wife duo Grethe and Jørgen Ingmann, representing . This was the first entry performed by a duo to win the contest and also the first Scandinavian win.

The song was performed eighth on the night, following 's Laila Halme with "Muistojeni laulu" and preceding 's Vice Vukov with "Brodovi". At the close of voting, it had received 42 points, thus winning from a field of 16.

Composition
The song is a sophisticated ballad in which the singer sings the praises of dancing, specifically with her "beloved friend".

Dansk Melodi Grand Prix
The Dansk Melodi Grand Prix was held at the Tivoli Concert Hall in Copenhagen, hosted by Marianne Birkelund.  Eight songs took part with the winner being chosen by a 10-member jury.  Other past and future Eurovision entrants competing were Birthe Wilke ( & ), Dario Campeotto, Bjørn Tidmand and Gitte Hænning (for ).

Eurovision Song Contest

Performance
On the night of the final the Ingmanns performed 8th in the running order, following  and preceding . It was sung by Grethe Ingmann and accompanied by Jørgen Ingmann on guitar.

John Kennedy O'Connor writes "the hypnotic tune was helped by the visual effects in the studio as a spinning vortex of whirling shapes spun around the screen, adding to the dream-like effect of the music.  It was the only song that relied entirely on visual rather than physical props and this helped it stand out".

Controversy
The pre-contest betting had suggested a two-horse race between Denmark and Switzerland, and the two songs quickly separated themselves from the pack in the early rounds of voting, which was done by each national jury awarding 5-4-3-2-1 to their top 5 songs. However, as the spokesman had not given the results in the required format (by firstly giving the performance number of the song), Boyle asked him to repeat the votes. This appeared to confuse him, and Boyle agreed that to avoid any delay, they would come back to the Norwegian jury after all the other countries had voted.

After the last scheduled jury in  had given their votes, Switzerland was ahead of Denmark by 39 points to 38.  Had the votes originally announced by Norway been allowed to stand, Switzerland would have won by 42 points to 40.  Boyle then went back to the spokesman in Oslo who now announced 5 to the United Kingdom, 4 to Denmark, 3 to Italy, 2 to Germany and 1 to Switzerland, giving the victory to Denmark by 2 points.  In response to the controversy which followed the show, the European Broadcasting Union investigated the role of the Norwegian jury and concluded that there was no evidence of wrongdoing, with the confusion arising from misunderstandings.  Notwithstanding, an element of suspicion has hung over the 1963 result ever since and it remains, along with 1968, the most contentious contest outcome in Eurovision history.

"Dansevise" has a very high reputation in Eurovision circles.  The song often features prominently in polls to determine the best Eurovision winners, and is cited as one of the best examples of a Eurovision winner which does not date and still holds wide appeal.

Points awarded to Denmark

Charts

English version and covers 
Following the Contest, Grethe and Jørgen Ingmann also recorded and released "Dansevise" in English with the title "I Loved You".

The song is also published in Swedish by Anne-Lie Rydé and in Finnish by Laila Kinnunen.

Danish hip-hop band Outlandish sampled the song in their track "Kom igen" which is featured in the game FIFA 07.

DR decided to include "Dansevise" in the opening sequence of the Eurovision Song Contest 2014 Grand Final.

Grethe Sønck inherited the rights to the song after Sejr Volmer-Sørensen's death. Grethe Sønck took great care of the song and very few were allowed to record it or use it. After her death, it has become easier to get the rights to use it. Among other things, it has been used as background music in a bank advertisement.

See also
Denmark in the Eurovision Song Contest
Eurovision Song Contest 1963

References

Songs about dancing
Eurovision songs of Denmark
Danish-language songs
Eurovision songs of 1963
Eurovision Song Contest winning songs
Metronome Records singles
1963 songs